= Kasani Narayana =

Indian politician

Kasani Narayana (1 November 1928 – 8 February 2005) was a Member of Legislative Assembly in Andhra Pradesh, India. He fought against the Nizam authorities in Telangana and worked for social justice. He was on the monitoring panel for peace talks between the government of Andhra Pradesh and the Maoist Party in India.

During the peace talks between the government of Andhra Pradesh and the Maoist Party of India, Narayana was on the Peace monitoring panel.
